Francis Rowley (27 September 1835 – 23 June 1862) was an Australian cricketer. He played two first-class matches for New South Wales between 1860/61 and 1861/62.

See also
 List of New South Wales representative cricketers

References

External links
 

1835 births
1862 deaths
Australian cricketers
New South Wales cricketers
Cricketers from Sydney